Mathias, a given name and a surname which is a variant of Matthew (name), may refer to:

Places
 Mathias, West Virginia
 Mathias Township, Michigan

People with the given name or surname Mathias

In music
 Mathias Eick, Norwegian Jazz Musician
 Mathias Färm, the guitarist of Millencolin
 Mathias Lillmåns, Finnish lead singer of folk/black metal band Finntroll
 William Mathias, Welsh composer
 Mathias Nygård a.k.a. Warlord, Finnish folk metal singer

In sports
 Mathias Bourgue, French tennis player
 Mathias Fischer (basketball), German basketball coach
 Mathias Jørgensen, nicknamed Zanka, Danish football player
 Mathias Kiwanuka, American football player
 Mathias Olsson (born 1973), Swedish former professional ice hockey defenceman
 Mathias Pogba (born 1990), Guinean professional footballer
 Mathias Svensson, Swedish professional footballer
 Bob Mathias, American decathlete, two-time Olympic gold medalist, and United States Congressman
 David Mathias, Indian cricketer
 Mark Mathias (born 1994), American baseball player
 Merritt Mathias, American soccer player
 Wallis Mathias, first non-Muslim cricketer to play for Pakistan

In other fields
 Mathias Énard, French novelist
 Mathias Gnädinger (1941–2015), Swiss actor
 Mathias Lauridsen, Danish male model
 Mathias Lerch, Czech mathematician who published about 250 papers
 Mathias Rust, German amateur aviator
 Mathias Tegnér (born 1979), Swedish politician
 Charles Mathias (1922–2010), Republican member of the United States Senate
 Clarence Edward Mathias, American Medal of Honor recipient
 James Goronwy Mathias, Welsh minister and writer
 Ronald Mathias, Trade Union Leader in Wales
 Tania Mathias, British Conservative Party politician, Member of Parliament (MP) for Twickenham since 2015'
 Thomas James Mathias, British satirist
 A. Mathias Mundadan, Indian historian

See also
 Matias
 Matthew (disambiguation)
 Matthias
 Mattias
 Mattathias

Masculine given names